Keretapi Tanah Melayu Berhad (KTMB) (Jawi: كريتاڤي تانه ملايو برحد) or Malayan Railways Limited is the main rail operator in Peninsular Malaysia.  The railway system dates back to the British colonial era, when it was first built to transport tin. Previously known as the Federated Malay States Railways (FMSR) and the Malayan Railway Administration (MRA), Keretapi Tanah Melayu acquired its current name in 1962. The organisation was corporatised in 1992, but remains wholly owned by the Malaysian government.

History 

In 1948, the FMSR was renamed the Malayan Railways. The railways had been devastated by the Japanese invasion of Malaya, and efforts were taken to rebuild the two main lines, but many branch lines were abandoned in the process.

The MR began to modernize the equipment with the ordering of diesel locomotives and railcars to replace steam hauled services, and the first diesel locomotive entered service in 1957. The railcars entered service in 1960, initially on short haul services. Rapid services were introduced later, cutting travel times from Singapore to Kuala Lumpur down to six hours, which was competitive at the time. MR and later KTM continued ordering more diesel locomotives through the decades, rendering the old steam locomotives redundant. The last steam locomotive was withdrawn from service in 1974.

Malayan Railways also operated an air service from 1954 to 1958, known as Federation Air Service. The service was transferred to Malayan Airways in March 1958.

The 1970s saw the closure of many branch lines, such as the Batu Arang branch in 1971 and the historic Taiping to Port Weld branch in 1972. The Port Dickson branch was converted to freight only operation in 1972, although seasonal passenger service did continue for a short while. However, construction did continue for a new line to Subang Airport used to transport fuel, which opened in 1980.

Railbuses were introduced in the 1980s for short haul commuter services. They were deployed in the Klang Valley, Kuala Lumpur to Ipoh, Ipoh to Butterworth, Gemas to Mentakab and Kulai to Singapore services. On certain routes such as Kulai to Singapore, the railbuses were faster than conventional trains, and in this instance saved travel time of 15 minutes. They lasted until the introduction of KTM Komuter in 1995, which took over commuter services in the Klang Valley.

KTM was corporatised in 1992, with all assets now under the ownership and management of the Railway Assets Corporation (RAC). The company runs as a private enterprise although owned and subsidized by the Malaysian government. There were attempts by private companies to take over the operations since then, but such proposals were rejected by the Malaysian government.

The 1990s saw the start of another modernization programme. Proposals were made to electrify the West Coast line, which started with the Klang Valley area. Electric trains made their debut on 3 August 1995 with KTM Komuter, with services from Port Klang to Sentul and Rawang to Seremban. Under this programme, existing stations were renovated or rebuilt and new stations were built.

The programme was faced with delays throughout the 2000s, with the government postponing many electrification projects. However, from 2007 onwards there was a renewed effort to electrify the west coast line. The completion of such electrification projects from Padang Besar to Gemas to date has allowed the commencement of electrified intercity services in the form of ETS. As the projects were completed in stages, the KTM Komuter and ETS services were expanded over the years to take advantage of the upgraded lines. The East Coast line, which had not seen upgrades for many years, will see upgrades in the form of rehabilitated track, new DMUs and rebuilt stations by 2021.

Railway network

The 1000mm gauge network consists of two main lines and several branch lines.

West Coast Line 

The West Coast Line runs from the Malaysia-Thailand Border, where it connects with the State Railway of Thailand, to Woodlands Train Checkpoint in Singapore, serving the West Coast states of Peninsular Malaysia. The line runs through most of the major stations in Peninsular Malaysia, such as Gemas, KL Sentral, Ipoh, Butterworth and Padang Besar railway station.

East Coast Line

The East Coast Line branches off from the West Coast line at Gemas, running to Tumpat in Kelantan, serving two of Peninsular Malaysia's East Coast states, namely Pahang and Kelantan. Despite its name, it only meets the coast when it reaches Tumpat railway station. It runs through the interior, often through deep jungle, thus earning the nickname Jungle Railway.

Branch lines 
There are several branch lines running from the two main lines. Some are mixed traffic, catering to passenger and freight traffic while others only cater to freight trains.

 Subang Jaya - Terminal Skypark (Passenger)

 Putra - Batu Caves (Passenger)
 Butterworth - Bukit Mertajam (Mixed Traffic)
 Port Klang - Pulau Indah (Freight)
 Butterworth - North Butterworth Container Terminal (Freight)
 Kempas Baru - Tanjung Pelepas (Freight)
 Kempas Baru - Pasir Gudang (Freight)

Infrastructure
The total network spans .

The West Coast line is double tracked and electrified between Padang Besar and Gemas, along with all branch lines used for passenger service along this stretch. As part of the upgrades, all level crossings have been removed and modern signaling installed.

The stations along these line are a combination of heritage stations from the colonial era, such as Ipoh Station and Kuala Lumpur Station, and modern stations that were built when the line was double tracked, such as Taiping, Butterworth, Arau station.

The remainder of the West Coast main line from Gemas Station to Johor Bahru Sentral Station is still being in the process of being double tracked and electrified under the Gemas - Johor Bahru Electrified Double Track Project.

The East Coast line is single tracked. Having not seen much upgrades over the years, the line is considerably less modern than the upgraded sections of the West Coast line. Level crossings are still prevalent and the traditional token signaling system is still used. The stations along this line are older and smaller. Although the line will remain single tracked, rehabilitation works are underway to replace the worn track and many stations are also being upgraded.

Most of the lines use concrete sleepers, which had replaced wooden sleepers from 1982 for the Kerdau-Jerantut and Sungai Yu-Tumpat lines and became more widespread after upgrading works in recent years.

When the East Coast Line rehabilitation work and West Coast line double tracking is complete, the network will exclusively use concrete sleepers.

Rolling stock

Depots

Northern Depot 
 Padang Besar Depot
 Bukit Tengah Depot
 Batu Gajah Depot
 ETS Batu Gajah Depot
 Central Workshop Batu Gajah

Central Depot 
 KL Sentral Depot
 Port Klang Depot
 Sentul Depot

Southern Depot 
 SCS Seremban Depot
 Gemas Depot
 Kempas Baru Depot

East Coast Depot 
 Tumpat Depot
 Kuala Lipis Depot

Services 
As a national railway company, KTMB is involved in the business of providing rail based transportation. This can be divided into four major services:

KTM Intercity 

KTM Intercity (Malay: KTM Antarabandar) is the brand name for long-haul passenger train that connect cities and major town served by KTMB rail network.

The service is provided using conventional locomotives hauled coaches. Service span the length of the network, except branch-lines. Daily service convey passengers from Johor Bahru, Johor, to Tumpat, Kelantan, Johor Bahru, Johor, to Gemas, Negeri Sembilan and Johor Bahru, Johor to Woodlands, Singapore.

KTM Intercity has also introduce innovative services aimed at making its train not merely a means of transportation. It is possible for customers to rent specialized coaches for event management, conference and even wedding.

It has also been involved in various type of collaborations, joint-promotions, and cross-promotions with all state-level tourism bodies, travel agencies and travel-related industry players in developing rail package for group travelers.

ETS (Electric Train Service)

KTM ETS, which stands for Electric Train Service, is a rapid intercity train service by KTM utilizing electric train-sets. The service started in 2010 using metre-gauge.

It currently operates between the cities from Gemas, Negeri Sembilan to Padang Besar, Perlis, Kuala Lumpur to Ipoh, Perak, and Kuala Lumpur to Butterworth, Penang.

For example, the travel time between KL Sentral and Ipoh is about 2 hours and 20 minutes, which compared favorably with the previous intercity train travel time of 3 hours and 30 minutes while buses can take up to 3 hours.

Each train sets is capable of carrying up to 350 passengers. The passengers are waited upon by a team of dedicated on-board steward and stewardess.

KTM Komuter 

KTM Komuter is a commuter rail service serving the Klang Valley and Northern part of Malaysia.

The central sector consists of the Batu Caves Line, Seremban/Pulau Sebang Line, Port Klang Line and Tanjung Malim Line. Since 2018, KTM Komuter also operates an airport train service - the  linking KL Sentral to the Subang Airport. The fleet presently consists of Class 83 (three cars) and Class 92 (six cars).

The Northern Sector consists of two routes, namely the Butterworth/Bukit Mertajam-Padang Rengas route as well as the Butterworth-Padang Besar route.

KTM Komuter is a heavily utilised mode of transportation by commuters working in Kuala Lumpur as the service is an alternative for road travel, which is occasionally hampered by congestion. Virtually all KTM Komuter stops offer "Park & Ride" parking lots for those who drive to and from the station or halt.

KTM Kargo 
KTM Kargo provides cargo conveyance services, with a network that spans almost the whole of the KTMB rail network. It is therefore highly accessible from seaports and Inland Container Terminal (ICT) as well as industrial centers.

Cargo services is a major contributor to KTM's overall revenue. It is set to further enhance its role with the rapidly growing demand for transportation of goods.

Currently, there are 45 cargo train services daily with 23 routes daily, of which about 70% are concentrated in the Northern sector. KTMB runs 37 freight train services daily of which about 80% were concentrated in the Northern sector.

The services include
 Bukit Ketri - Kuang (Cement)
 Padang Rengas - Batu Caves (Cement)
 Padang Rengas - Gelang Patah (Cement)
 Kanthan - Padang Jawa (Cement)
 Tasek - Gelang Patah (Cement)
 Prai - Padang Besar (South Thai Cargo)
 Pelabuhan Klang - Prai (Landfeeder)
 Pelabuhan Klang - Padang Besar (Landfeeder)
 Pelabuhan Klang - Ipoh (Landfeeder)
 Pelabuhan Klang - Pasir Gudang (Landfeeder)
 North Port - West Port (Inter Terminal Transfer)
 West Port - North Port (Inter Terminal Transfer)
 PTP - Pasir Gudang (Inter Terminal Transfer)
 Prai - Thungsong (Landbridge)
 Prai - Surathani (Landbridge)
 Prai - Padang Besa (Thai) - (Landbridge)
 Pelabuhan Klang - Hatyai (Landbridge)
 Sungai Way - Bangkok (Landbridge)
 Prai - Sungai Buloh (Sugar)
 Gurun - Butterworth (Urea)

Main commodities carried by rail comprise the following:
 Maritime containers
 Landbridge cargos
 Cement
 Sugar
 Gypsum
 Chemicals
There is a variety of wagons from a fleet of almost 3,000 to choose from, to cater to almost all types of cargo imaginable to be moved. Is it managed, by a group of customer-focused professionals who are in position to help with the customer's needs and requirements.

Generally, cargo is moved either in open or covered wagons. In the future, all covered wagons will be replaced with containers to allow for flexibility i.e. goods can be dismounted from the train and delivered directly to customers premises thus, living up to the concept of door-to-door delivery.

Non-rail subsidiaries
KTM operates several non-rail subsidiaries. Though considered as non-core businesses, KTMB has benefited from these two operations which is:

Multimodal Freight (MMF)
Multimodal Freight Sdn. Bhd., incorporated in 1988, was licensed as a Government approved Container Haulier in 1991, and went on to obtain the Government approved Multimodal Transport Operator (MTO) status in 1999. The company operates a fleet of 225 Prime Movers and 1,300 trailer of both 20-feet and 40-feet configurations. The fleet is deployed at all major seaports and the inland ports of Ipoh and Nilai.

 KTM Distribution (KTMD)

Its core business is in the provision of express parcel distribution services to the commercial, industrial and administrative sectors and it operates within Malaysia and Singapore. Parcel distribution is carried out through its door-to-door service or from point to point through its station-to-station service. This service has so far been monopoly of the Postal Department.

Modernisation

Since the corporatisation of KTMB, a programme of modernization has been underway. In 1989, it embarked on the double-tracking and electrification of the trunk line between Rawang and Seremban, the branch lines between Batu Junction and Sentul and between Kuala Lumpur and Port Klang, allowing KTM Komuter services to start running in 1995. Successive double tracking projects has allowed for expansion of electric traction to intercity services in the form of ETS. The entire West Coast line is scheduled to be fully electrified by 2022.

Completed projects 
 Electrification and double tracking of the Rawang-Seremban route (1990–1994) (US$62 million)
 Electrification and double tracking of the Kuala Lumpur-Port Klang railway route, including spur lines to Subang Jaya and Sentul (1991–1994) (US$66 million)
Construction of railway bridges, road over bridges and underpasses along the Rawang-Kajang route (1991–1994) (US$6 million)
 Construction of railway bridges, road over bridges and underpasses along the Kajang-Seremban route (1991–1994) (US$16 million)
 Widening of railway tunnels near Seremban (1994–1995) (US$4 million)
 Construction of railway culverts and box pushing along the Nilai-Seremban route (1994–1995) (US$4 million)
Track linking Port Klang to Pulau Indah (1997–1999) (US$4 million)
 Construction of the Port of Tanjung Pelepas, a rail link in Johor (1999–2002) (US$121 million)
 Track works at Kuala Lumpur Sentral station (1999–2001) (RM14.3 million)
Electrification and double tracking of the Rawang-Ipoh route (2000-2008) (RM2.57 billion)
Electrification and double tracking of the Sentul-Batu Caves route (2006-2010) (RM515 million)
Electrification and double tracking of the Seremban-Gemas route (2008-2013) (RM3.45 billion)
Electrification and double tracking of the Ipoh-Padang Besar route (2008-2014) (RM12.5 billion)
Electrification and double tracking of Subang Jaya-Subang Airport route (2013-2018) (RM521 million)
 A new integrated station named Penang Sentral built which will connect KTM Railway, monorail, bus and ferry service in one building at Butterworth.

Current projects 
 Electrification and double tracking of Gemas-JB route (2018-2022)
 Rehabilitation of tracks in the Klang Valley(KVDT), Phase 1 (2016-2021)
 Rehabilitation of tracks in the Klang Valley (KVDT), Phase 2 (2019 - 2027)
 Rehabilitation of tracks Gemas - Mentakab (Package A) (2016 - 2020)
 Rehabilitation of tracks Jerantut - Gua Musang (Package B) (2016 - 2020)
 Rehabilitation of tracks Gua Musang - Tumpat (Package C) (2016 -2020)

Proposed projects 
 Outer Ring Railway Service to connect all suburbs in the Klang Valley without going through the city center.
 Construction of the Subang Jaya - Sungai Buloh Link which will act as a freight bypass to avoid freight trains from having to enter the Kuala Lumpur Komuter network. Works are divided into two phases; Phase 1 is from Subang Jaya - Subang Airport, Phase 2 is from Subang Airport - Sungai Buloh. As of now, Phase 1 had already been completed.
 Extension of the ETS service to Hat Yai

Board of directors
 Chairman: YBhg. Datuk Musa Hj Sheikh Fadzir
 Chief Executive Officer (CEO): YBrs. Encik Mohd Rani Hisham Samsudin
 Non-Independent, Non-Executive Director: YBrs. Encik Iszad Jeffri Ismail
 Independent Non-Executive Director: YBrs. Encik Md Silmi Abd Rahman, YBhg.Datuk Seri Yew Teong Look
 Heads of Strategic Business Units;
KTM Intercity: Puan Nurul Azha Mokmin
 KTM Komuter: Encik Roshidi Yahaya
 KTM Kargo: Encik Mohd Din Mohamad

Previous and current logos

See also
 Rail transport in Malaysia
 Prasarana Malaysia
 Railway Assets Corporation
 MRT Corp
 Sabah State Railway
 Transport in Malaysia

References

Notes

Bibliography

External links
 Keretapi Tanah Melayu Official Website

1885 establishments in British Malaya
 
Railway companies of Malaysia
Metre gauge railways in Malaysia
Malaysian brands
Government-owned companies of Malaysia
Government-owned railway companies
Minister of Finance (Incorporated) (Malaysia)
Privately held companies of Malaysia